James Patrick Hoye (born February 8, 1971) is an American umpire in Major League Baseball. He wears number 92. He was hired to the full-time Major League staff prior to the 2010 season. Hoye has worked one All-Star Game (2015), two World Series (2019, 2022), three League Championship Series (2018, 2020, 2021), four Division Series (2011, 2015, 2019, 2022), and four Wild Card Games (2014, 2018, 2020, 2021). He was promoted to crew chief in 2023.

Career
Hoye has been a professional umpire since 1997. He has worked in the New York–Penn League, South Atlantic League, Florida State League, Eastern League and International League before reaching MLB. He also officiated in the 2006 World Baseball Classic.

Hoye was the first base umpire for Mark Buehrle's no-hitter against the Texas Rangers on April 18, .

Hoye was the plate umpire for James Paxton’s no-hitter against the Toronto Blue Jays on May 8, 2018.

Personal life
Hoye graduated from Ohio State University and lives in Florida with his wife, Sharri, and their three children. He has participated in UMPS CARE charity events.

See also 

List of Major League Baseball umpires

References

External links
Major League profile
Retrosheet
The Baseball Cube

Living people
1971 births
People from Parma, Ohio
Major League Baseball umpires
Ohio State University alumni